The 2014–15 New Mexico Lobos women's basketball team represented the University of New Mexico during the 2014–15 NCAA Division I women's basketball season. The Lobos, led by fourth year head coach Yvonne Sanchez. They played their home games at The Pit and were members of the Mountain West Conference. They finished the season 21–13, 14–4 in Mountain West play to finish in second place. They advanced to the championship game of the Mountain West Conference women's basketball tournament where they lost to Boise State. They were invited to the Women's Basketball Invitational where they defeated North Dakota in the first round before losing to Oral Roberts in the quarterfinals.

Roster

Schedule and results

|-
!colspan=9 style="background:#D3003F; color:white;"| Exhibition

|-
!colspan=9 style="background:#D3003F; color:white;"| Non-Conference Regular Season

|-
!colspan=9 style="background:#D3003F; color:white;"| Mountain West Regular Season

|-
!colspan=9 style="background:#D3003F; color:white;"| Mountain West Women's Tournament

|-
!colspan=9 style="background:#D3003F; color:white;"| WBI

See also
2014–15 New Mexico Lobos men's basketball team

References

New Mexico
2014 in sports in New Mexico
2015 in sports in New Mexico
New Mexico Lobos women's basketball seasons